The 2020 Liqui Moly Bathurst 12 Hour was an endurance race that was staged on the Mount Panorama Circuit near Bathurst, in New South Wales, Australia on 2 February 2020. The event was open to cars in GT and touring car classes, namely GT3 and GT4. It was the 18th running of the Bathurst 12 Hour, and the opening round of both the 2020 Intercontinental GT Challenge and the 2020 Australian Endurance Championship.

39 cars were entered and 34 cars started, with five entries withdrawn following crashes in practice & qualifying.

Class structure 

Cars will compete in the following four classes.
 Class A – GT3 Outright
 (GT3 Pro)
 (GT3 Pro-Am)
 (GT3 Silver) 
 Class C – GT4
 Class I – Invitational

No entries were recorded for Class B, for Lamborghini Huracán Super Trofeo Evo, Porsche 911 GT3 Cup and new Ferrari 488 Challenge Evo spec vehicles.

Results

Qualifying

Top 10 shootout

Race

Notes
  – Car No. 999 received a 30 seconds post-race penalty for a pit procedure infringement.
  – Car No. 46 received a 270 seconds post-race penalty 
  – Cars No. 95 and No. 20 were both running at the finish of the race, but failed to complete the minimum laps necessary to be classified.

References

External links
 

Motorsport in Bathurst, New South Wales
Liqui Moly Bathurst 12 Hour
Liqui Moly Bathurst 12 Hour
Bathurst